Toco is a city in Lamar County, Texas, United States. The population was 75 at the 2010 census, and 91 in 2020.

Geography

Toco is located in west-central Lamar County at  (33.655250, –95.646152). U.S. Route 82 forms the southern boundary of the community; it leads east  to Paris, the county seat, and west  to Honey Grove.

The city's land drains east to the South Branch of Pine Creek, a northeast-flowing tributary of the Red River.

Demographics

As of the 2020 United States census, there were 91 people, 40 households, and 28 families residing in the city. As of the census of 2000, there were 89 people, 34 households, and 26 families residing in the city. The population density was 523.7 people per square mile (202.1/km). There were 35 housing units at an average density of 205.9 per square mile (79.5/km). The racial makeup of the city was 17.98% White, 76.40% African American, 2.25% Native American, 2.25% from other races, and 1.12% from two or more races. Hispanic or Latino of any race were 3.37% of the population.

There were 34 households, out of which 23.5% had children under the age of 18 living with them, 50.0% were married couples living together, 20.6% had a female householder with no husband present, and 23.5% were non-families. 23.5% of all households were made up of individuals, and 11.8% had someone living alone who was 65 years of age or older. The average household size was 2.62 and the average family size was 3.00.

In the city, the population was spread out, with 28.1% under the age of 18, 6.7% from 18 to 24, 20.2% from 25 to 44, 29.2% from 45 to 64, and 15.7% who were 65 years of age or older. The median age was 43 years. For every 100 females, there were 81.6 males. For every 100 females age 18 and over, there were 77.8 males.

The median income for a household in the city was $16,250, and the median income for a family was $18,333. Males had a median income of $27,500 versus $26,250 for females. The per capita income for the city was $8,099. There were 50.0% of families and 56.0% of the population living below the poverty line, including 83.3% of under eighteens and 23.1% of those over 64.

Education
The city is served by the Chisum Independent School District.

Notable people

 Rocky Thompson, pro golfer and former mayor of Toco

References

Cities in Lamar County, Texas
Cities in Texas